National Sports Centre may refer to:

National Sports Centres, multiple centres in England
National Sports Centre, in Kamëz, Tiranë, Albania
National Sports Centre, in Devonshire Parish, Bermuda
National Sports Centre, in Douglas, Isle of Man

See also
Crystal Palace National Sports Centre
National Olympic Sports Centre
National Sports Campus
National Sports Centre Papendal
National Sports Center, United States
National Sports Stadium (disambiguation)